The Telephone Girl was a serial based on stories by J.C. Witwer. The screenplays were written by a young Darryl F. Zanuck.

References

1922 films
American black-and-white films
American silent serial films
1920s American films